After Torture There's Pain is the second mixtape by Army of the Pharaohs. It was released after the band's debut album The Torture Papers.

Track listing
 Intro
 Blitz
 Murder Death Kill
 Prince of Darkness
 This is War
 The Pharaohs
 QD Cut
 Already Dead
 Are You Ready
 Divine Evil
 Every Second
 The Army
 Real Villains
 Gods and Generals
 Cult Status
 You Can Try
 Chain Reaction (Remix)
 Speak Now
 Gangsta, Gangsta
 Band of Brothers
 Silence & I
 Burning Candles

References

2007 mixtape albums
Army of the Pharaohs albums
Babygrande Records albums